The Walter T. Noonan House on S. Seventh St. in Oakes, North Dakota, United States, was built in 1924.  Known also as House of 29, it was designed by Dennis & Knowle.  It was listed on the National Register of Historic Places in 1987.  The listing included two contributing buildings.

According to its NRHP nomination, the house "is significant as the outstanding architecturally significant residence in Oakes. The design is unmatched in Oakes on the basis of aesthetic character."

The house was home of Walter Noonan, president of the North American Creamery Company, which became the largest employer in Oakes.

The house was for sale in 2016.

The house re-opened in 2018 as a bed and breakfast and event venue under the name NoonanHouse.com

References

Houses in Dickey County, North Dakota
Houses completed in 1924
Houses on the National Register of Historic Places in North Dakota
National Register of Historic Places in Dickey County, North Dakota
1924 establishments in North Dakota
Bungalow architecture in North Dakota